You Know the Number is an album by Henry Threadgill released on the RCA Novus label in 1986.  The album and features six of Threadgill's compositions performed by Threadgill's Sextett with Frank Lacy, Rasul Siddik, Fred Hopkins, Diedre Murray, Pheeroan akLaff and Reggie Nicholson.

Reception
The Allmusic review by Stephen Cook awarded the album 4½ stars, stating, "This title is a must for Threadgill fans and also worthwhile for those interested in the experimental side of jazz".

Track listing
All compositions by Henry Threadgill
 "Bermuda Blues" - 9:26 
 "Silver and Gold, Baby Silver and Gold" - 5:45 
 "Theme from Thomas Cole" - 6:39 
 "Good Times" - 6:33 
 "To Be Announced" - 6:27 
 "Those Who Eat Cookies" - 6:16 Bonus track on CD
Recorded at Uptown Chelsea Sound, New York City on October 12 & 13, 1986

Personnel
Henry Threadgill - alto saxophone, tenor saxophone, bass flute
Rasul Siddik - trumpet
Frank Lacy - trombone
Diedre Murray - cello
Fred Hopkins - bass
Reggie Nicholson - percussion
Pheeroan akLaff - percussion

References

1986 albums
Henry Threadgill albums
Novus Records albums